Somayeh Abbaspour (born 7 September 1985) is an Iranian Paralympic archer.

She has competed once at the Summer Paralympics, three times at the World Para Athletics Championships and once at the Para Continental Championships.

References

External links
 video of Abbaspour's quarter-final match with Jodie Grinham of Great Britain

Paralympic archers of Iran
Archers at the 2016 Summer Paralympics
Living people
Iranian female archers
1985 births
People from Birjand
21st-century Iranian women